Gelis agilis is a tiny wingless hyperparasitoid wasp that attacks the parasitoid wasp Cotesia glomerata and other parasitoids, like Dinocampus coccinellae. It reproduces asexually, with adult females feeding on their hosts' hemolymph in order to create eggs.

References 

Ichneumonidae
Hyperparasites